The Central Comprehensively Deepening Reforms Commission, also translated as the Central Commission for Deepening Reform, is a policy formulation and implementation body set up under the Central Committee of the Chinese Communist Party (CCP) in charge of "Comprehensively Deepening Reforms". These reforms are intended to be even more far-reaching than the previous round of comprehensive Chinese economic reforms initiated by Deng Xiaoping.

The Commission's main task is to determine policy guidelines for reforming the economic, political, cultural, social, ethical and party-building systems in order to address long-term reform issues, as well as to guide reform-related bodies of the CCP at central and local level, and supervise the implementation of reform plans. According to observers, the group will have the ability to push policies past the bureaucracy and help General Secretary Xi Jinping consolidate his power over China's vast government apparatus, the State Council, usually the domain of the Premier.

The commission consists entirely of officials of at least "deputy national leader" rank in the official hierarchy. Most of the commission's members are also members of the Politburo of the CCP, a 25-member central decision-making body. Four of the seven members of the Politburo Standing Committee are also part of the group.

Role 
The commission has become the primary mechanism for top-level policymaking. Domestic structural issues are its policy focus. It deliberates on and approves strategic policies in this area, with the drafting and implementing of policies being delegated to either government ministries or local branches of the commission. These other bodies submit reports to the central commission. 

In practice, the Xi-chaired commission outranks state administration decision-making organs, including the National Development and Reform Commission and the State Council. Despite its powerful influence, the commission is a Party body and does not have the formal authority to make law.

History 
The commission was originally established as the Central Leading Group for Comprehensively Deepening Reforms. The decision to establish the group was announced at the 3rd Plenary Session of the 18th Central Committee in November 2013, which also approved a Decision of the CCP Central Committee on Comprehensively Deepening Reforms. On 30 December 2013, the Politburo announced that the group had been formed with Xi Jinping, the CCP's General Secretary and China's president, as its leader (zuzhang), and Li Keqiang, Liu Yunshan, and Zhang Gaoli as deputy leaders (fuzuzhang). 

In March 2018, the leading group is transformed to be the committee, which called the Central Comprehensively Deepening Reforms Commission.

From its first meeting in early 2014 through the end of 2021, the commission convened sixty-one times.

Organization
The implementation of the Leading Group's policy goals is delegated to six "special groups".

Economic system and ecological civilization reform group
Democracy and legal system reform special group
Cultural Reform Commission
Social system reform special group
Special Committee for the Reform of the Party Building System
Discipline inspection system reform special group

Membership

19th Committee
Leader
Xi Jinping (Politburo Standing Committee, Party General Secretary, State President)
Deputy Leaders
Li Keqiang (Politburo Standing Committee, Premier of the State Council)
Wang Huning (Politburo Standing Committee, First secretary of the Secretariat)
Han Zheng (Politburo Standing Committee, Vice Premier)
Membership
Not yet released publicly
Office of Deepening Reform
Wang Huning, director
Mu Hong, executive deputy chief of the General Office (deputy director of the National Development and Reform Commission, minister-level)

References 

Politburo of the Chinese Communist Party
Government agencies of China
Government agencies established in 2013
2013 establishments in China